Kal Chuquki (also Romanized as Kāl Chūqūkī, Kālchoqūkī, Kālchūqakī, Kālchūqūkī, and Kāl-e Choqūkī) is a village in Meyami Rural District, Razaviyeh District, Mashhad County, Razavi Khorasan Province, Iran. At the 2006 census, its population was 746, in 175 families.

References 

Populated places in Mashhad County